Bradlee Thomas Farrin (born 1964) is an American politician from Maine. Farrin, a Republican, was first elected to the Maine House of Representatives in 2014 (District 111). Re-elected in 2016, Farrin won election to the Maine Senate in 2018 (District 3). He is a resident of Norridgewock, Maine and represents a largely rural district covering Somerset County, Maine.

Farrin ran for office after retiring from 29 years in the United States Air Force. He is an alumnus of Skowhegan Area High School and the Community College of the Air Force.

References

1964 births
Living people
People from Norridgewock, Maine
Republican Party members of the Maine House of Representatives
Republican Party Maine state senators
Skowhegan Area High School alumni
Community College of the Air Force alumni
21st-century American politicians